Goresky is a surname. Notable people with the surname include:

 Carl Goresky (1932–1996), Canadian physician and researcher
 Isidore Goresky (1902–1999), Canadian farm laborer, teacher, and provincial politician
 Mark Goresky (born 1950), Canadian mathematician

See also
 Gorsky (disambiguation)